A two disc compilation of R&B songs from 1945 to 1970 recorded in Nashville, Tennessee. The compilation was spawned by an exhibit at the Country Music Hall of Fame and Museum.  It won a Grammy Award for producers Michael Gray and Daniel Cooper and audio engineers Joe Palmaccio and Alan Stoker in 2005.

Track listing

 Nashville Jumps 	
 Buzzard Pie 	
 Skip's Boogie 	
 L & N Special 	
 Sittin' Here Drinking 	
 Just Walkin In The Rain 	
 If You And I Could Be Sweethearts 	
 Baby Let's Play House 	
 Christene 	
 It's Love Baby (24 Hours a Day)	
 Rollin' Stone 	
 You Can Make It If You Try
 Rockin' The Joint 	
 Let's Trade A Little 	
 Say You Really Care 	
 Somebody, Somewhere 	
 Pipe Dreams 	
 WLAC commercial 	
 White Rose 	
Disc: 2 	
 WLAC Air Check/Monkey Doin' Woman 	
 What'd I Say
 Really Part 1 	
 Just Like Him 	
 Anna (Go To Him) 	
 Snap Your Fingers 	
 Mama, He Treats Your Daughter Mean 	
 Something Tells Me 	
 Sunny 	
 I Want To Do Everything For You 	
 Bigger And Better 	
 Since I Met You Baby 	
 The Chokin' Kind 	
 She Shot A Hole In My Soul 	
 Gotta Get Yourself Together 	
 Soul Shake 	
 Reconsider Me 	
 Everlasting Love

References

2004 compilation albums
Rhythm and blues compilation albums
Lost Highway Records compilation albums
Country Music Hall of Fame and Museum